Merrillville High School (MHS) is a public high school in Merrillville, Indiana, United States, for students in grades nine through twelve.

About
Merrillville High School is the only high school in the Merrillville Community School Corporation. In the 2009–10 school year, it added a Freshman Center Wing to its northeast corner.

Demographics
The demographics of the 2,182 students enrolled in school year 2019-20 were as follows:
Male - 50%
Female - 50%
Native American - 0.1%
Asian/Pacific islander - 1.1%
Black - 66%
Hispanic - 18%
White - 10%
Multiracial - 5%

Athletics
The Merrillville Pirates compete in the Duneland Athletic Conference. The school colors are purple, black and white. The following IHSAA-sanctioned sports are offered:

Baseball (boys')
Basketball (boys' & girls')
Cross country (boys' & girls')
Football (boys')
State champion - 1976
Golf (boys' & girls')
Gymnastics (girls')
State champion - 1986, 1992
Soccer (boys' & girls')
Softball (girls')
State champion - 1993, 1997
Swimming (boys' & girls')
Tennis (boys' & girls')
Track (boys' & girls')
Unified Track (coed)
Volleyball (boys' & girls')
Wrestling (boys' & girls')

Notable alumni

David Bedella - Actor / Entertainer
Brandon Jordan  CFL defensive lineman for Calgary Stampede
Maureen Mahoney - former deputy solicitor general
Mike Neal - former NFL linebacker for the Green Bay Packers
Ryan Neal - NFL strong safety for the Seattle Seahawks
David Neville - Olympic medalist
Gregg Popovich - NBA head coach for the San Antonio Spurs
Jamel Williams - former NFL safety for the Washington Redskins
Eugene Wilson - former NFL safety for the Houston Texans, Tampa Bay Buccaneers and the New England Patriots

See also
 List of high schools in Indiana

References

External links
 

Public high schools in Indiana
Schools in Lake County, Indiana